The blacksmith (Chromis punctipinnis), also known as the blacksmith chromis and blacksmith damselfish, is a species of fish in the damselfish family. It is native to the subtropical northeastern Pacific Ocean, where it range is from Monterey Bay, California, USA, to central Baja California, Mexico. This small fish is associated with rocky reefs and kelp forests.

Description
The blacksmith can reach  in length. It is blue-black in color with small black spots towards the tail. The scales are large. The tail is forked. The juvenile is two-toned with a blue-grey front and a brownish-orange rear.

Ecology

Habitat
It also inhabits kelp forests.

Diet
The diet includes marine algae and zooplankton.

Behaviour
The blacksmith rests in rocky crevices during the night. It is known to be territorial, and, although small, it acts aggressively toward other fish. Juveniles are pelagic and form schools. The blacksmith is symbiotic with the señorita. When it feels that it is starting to deteriorate in hygiene it will turn until it is perpendicular to the ground, allowing the señorita to clean it.

Reproduction
The blacksmith spawns during summer and autumn. The male cleans a nesting site, then herds a female to it. After spawning, the male guards the eggs until they hatch.

References

External links
 

punctipinnis
Western North American coastal fauna
Fish described in 1863
Taxa named by James Graham Cooper